Shahanshah is a title given to the Iranian Shahs (kings/emperors), meaning King of Kings (Shah of Shahs).

Shahanshah or Shahenshah may also refer to:

 Shahanshah, Lorestan, a village in Iran
 Shahanshah (Shirvanshah), the 22nd Shirvanshah
 Shahenshah (1953 film), a 1953 Bollywood film
 Shahenshah (1988 film), a 1988 Bollywood film
 Shahen-Shah (1988 Album), a 1988 album by Nusrat Fateh Ali Khan
 Shahenshah (2020 film), a 2020 Bangladeshi film. 
 Shahenshah (novel), a 1970 Marathi novel by N. S. Inamdar
 al-Afdal Shahanshah, Fatimid vizier in Cairo
 Shahanshah, son of Muhammad III of Alamut

See also
 Shah (disambiguation)
 List of shahanshahs of the Sasanian Empire
 List of monarchs of Persia
 Iranian monarchy